Daegeumsan is a mountain in Gyeonggi-do, South Korea. It sits in the county of Gapyeong.

See also
List of mountains in Korea

Notes

References

Mountains of Gyeonggi Province
Gapyeong County
Mountains of South Korea